Ignacy Witczak was a GRU illegal officer in the United States during World War II.

Witczak's code name with the GRU and as deciphered by the Venona project and other counterintelligence investigations was "R".

He operated under a cover of a student and then instructor at the University of Southern California in Los Angeles in the 1940s.

Shortly after the defection on 5 September 1945 of Igor Gouzenko, a GRU code clerk at the Soviet embassy in Ottawa, Samuel Witczak, an instructor at the University of Southern California, disappeared from a beach in Southern California, never to be seen again. Later his wife disappeared as well. In a 1952 Senate report, he was identified as a Soviet spy; his name had surfaced in the Venona decrypts. The FBI search for Witczak is described in the memoirs of FBI special agent Robert Lamphere. The FBI had learned Witczak had entered the United States from Canada on a false passport and suspected Witczak was not his true name. Later the FBI was able to trace some of Witczak's former agents, but never learned what happened to him. Enemy Amongst Trojans tells the rest of the story.

Recent document releases in Britain and Russia, one showing Kim Philby reported on him, identify Witczak as “Litvin” and explain what happened to him after returning to the Soviet Union. Litvin's GRU career ended during a purge of Jews, but he survived that, later becoming a translator of American books on intelligence.

Evidence of espionage
Ignacy Witczak is referenced in the following Venona decryptions and FBI reports:

3, 4, 5 KGB San Francisco to Moscow, 2 January 1946; 
25 KGB San Francisco to Moscow, 26 January 1946;detailing a Soviet espionage operation in the United States
FBI report, "Soviet Espionage Activities, 19 October 1945," attached to Hoover to Vaughan, 19 October 1945, President's Secretary's Files, Harry S. Truman Library, Independence, Mo.; 
FBI report, "Soviet Activities in the United States," 25 July 1946, Clark M. Clifford papers, Truman Library.

References

Further reading
William Stevenson, Intrepid's Last Case (New York: Villard Books, 1983).
New York FBI report, 5 April 1946, Comintern Apparatus file, serial 5236; FBI report, "Soviet Espionage Activities," 19 October 1945," attached to Hoover to Vaughan, 19 October 1945, President's Secretary's Files, Harry S. Truman Library, Independence, Mo.; 
FBI report, "Soviet Activities in the United States," 25 July 1946, Clark M. Clifford papers, Truman Library; *David Dallin, Soviet Espionage (New Haven: Yale University Press, 1955), pg. 286.
Robert J. Lamphere and Tom Shachtman, The FBI-KGB War: A Special Agent's Story (New York: Random House, 1995), 34–36. 
 John Earl Haynes and Harvey Klehr, Venona: Decoding Soviet Espionage in America, Yale University Press (1999), pgs. 183–185, 418–419, 370, 467.  The authors thank retired FBI agent John Walsh, who in 1946 tried to spot Bunia Witczak and her son on the deck of the Sakhalin when it docked in a South American port, for noting the likelihood that R. was Witczak.
Transparence et secret aux États-Unis (in French)

Soviet spies against the United States
Venona project
GRU officers